Pahal (meaning A beginning in Hindi) was one of the most influential literary magazines in the Hindi language that had seen uninterrupted publication since 1973. Brought out by Gyanranjan, noted Hindi novelist and short-story writer, from Jabalpur, the magazine publishes poetry, fiction, non-fiction, critique and essays concentrating on issues of contemporary interest. Although the publication does not have a declared periodicity, three to four issues are normally brought out every year.

Ideology
Pahal has held a distinct leftist leaning right since its inception. This can be partly attributed to the fact that its founding editor, Gyanranjan, is a noted leftist intellectual. Pahal has always laid emphasis on depicting the complexities of modern Indian society and problems arising thereof. The issues of Dalit and women's emancipation have been given adequate coverage, both at literary and debate levels, from time to time.

Pahal booklets
Besides its compelling literary content, Pahal is also famous for the booklets that it publishes (besides the issues) from time to time--often featuring the works of a prominent foreign author, long poems and debates on topics of socio-political significance. Past booklets have introduced readers in India, often for the first time, to the works of such stalwarts of world literature as Miroslav Holub, Afzal Ahmed Sayyed and Edward Said. A recent booklet focuses on poetry from the North-eastern states of India, often referred to as the Seven Sisters.

Pahal Sammaan
Every year, Pahal chooses an outstanding author writing in Indian languages for the Pahal Samman, its annual literary award. As a rule, the award-ceremony is held in the home-town of the author.

References

External links
http://pahalpatrika.com/

Hindi-language magazines
Literary magazines published in India
Magazines established in 1973
Triannual magazines
1973 establishments in Madhya Pradesh